The 2019 Lehigh Mountain Hawks football team represents Lehigh University in the 2019 NCAA Division I FCS football season. The Mountain Hawks are led by first-year head coach Tom Gilmore and play their home games at Goodman Stadium. They are a member of the Patriot League.

Previous season
The Mountain Hawks finished the 2018 season 3–8, 2–4 in Patriot League play to finish in a three-way tie for fourth place. Following the season, head coach Andy Coen stepped down as head football coach to focus on his health after receiving a diagnosis of early-onset Alzheimer's disease. On January 8, 2019 Lehigh announced the hire of Tom Gilmore as the new head football coach.

Preseason

Preseason coaches' poll
The Patriot League released their preseason coaches' poll on July 30, 2019 (voting was by conference head coaches and sports information directors). The Mountain Hawks were picked to finish in fifth place.

Preseason All-Patriot League team
The Mountain Hawks had one player selected to the preseason All-Patriot League team.

Offense

Jorge Portorreal – WR

Schedule

Source:

Game summaries

Saint Francis (PA)

at Villanova

at UC Davis

Merrimack

at Colgate

at Fordham

Georgetown

Holy Cross

at Bucknell

at Sacred Heart

Lafayette

References

Lehigh
Lehigh Mountain Hawks football seasons
Lehigh Mountain Hawks football